The Ariane Passenger PayLoad Experiment (APPLE), was an experimental communication satellite with a C-Band transponder launched by the Indian Space Research Organisation on June 19, 1981, by Ariane, a launch vehicle of the European Space Agency (ESA) from Centre Spatial Guyanais near Kourou in French Guiana.

APPLE was India's first three-axis stabilised experimental Geostationary communication satellite. On July 16, 1981, the satellite was positioned at 102° E longitude. The 672 kg satellite served as testbed of the Indian telecommunications space relay infrastructure despite the failure of one solar panel to deploy. Solid-propellant based Apogee Boost Motor to circularize APPLE's orbit was derived from SLV-3 fourth stage.

It was used in several communication experiments including relay of TV programmes and radio networking. It was a cylindrical spacecraft measuring 1.2 m in diameter and 1.2 m high. Its payload consisted of two 6/4 GHz transponders connected to a 0.9 m diameter parabolic antenna. It went out of service on September 19, 1983. R. M. Vasagam was the project director of APPLE during 1977-1983

See also

 List of Indian satellites

References

Communications satellites
Satellites of India
Spacecraft launched in 1981